Josip Lipokatič, sometimes listed as Josip Lipokatić (born 13 November 1921; date of death unknown), was a Yugoslav sprint canoeist from Maribor who competed in the early 1950s. At the 1952 Summer Olympics in Helsinki, he finished 13th in the K-1 10000 m event while being eliminated in heats of the K-1 1000 m event. He was born in Maribor.

References
 Josip Lipokatič's profile at Sports Reference.com

1921 births
Canoeists at the 1952 Summer Olympics
Olympic canoeists of Yugoslavia
Year of death missing
Yugoslav male canoeists
Slovenian male canoeists
Sportspeople from Maribor